Salvia mekongensis is a perennial plant native to Yunnan province in China, found growing on hilly grasslands at  elevation.

Notes

mekongensis
Flora of China